Lucas Elio Aveldaño (born 19 July 1985) is an Argentine footballer who plays for Chilean club Deportes Iquique as a central defender.

Career
Aveldaño began his playing career in 2005 with Atlético de Rafaela in the Argentine 2nd division. In 2008, he joined Racing Club de Avellaneda of the Primera División. On 31 October 2009 Aveldaño scored his first goal for Racing in a 4-0 home win against Atlético Tucumán.

External links

Lucas Aveldaño profile at BDFA 

1985 births
Living people
People from Rafaela
Sportspeople from Santa Fe Province
Argentine footballers
Argentine expatriate footballers
Association football defenders
Argentine Primera División players
Atlético de Rafaela footballers
Club Atlético Belgrano footballers
Racing Club de Avellaneda footballers
Nueva Chicago footballers
Segunda División players
RCD Mallorca players
CD Tenerife players
Universidad de Chile footballers
Chilean Primera División players
Expatriate footballers in Chile
Argentine expatriate sportspeople in Spain
Expatriate footballers in Spain
Primera Federación players
CD Tudelano footballers